Budgeting loans are a feature of the social security system in the United Kingdom. Budgeting Loans are interest free loans from the Social Fund that are available only to people claiming certain income-related benefits.

Although the discretionary element of the Social Fund was abolished those who have not yet been transferred over to Universal Credit can still apply. However, those in receipt of Universal Credit are ineligible for a budgeting loan and must instead apply for a Budgeting Advance instead.

The loan is meant to be used for household necessities and paying down existing consumer debt. The total sum can be up to £812, if the applicant is part of a couple with children. In 2019, the UK government has re-affirmed its commitment to the loan scheme.

References

 Budgeting-advance

Welfare state in the United Kingdom
Social Fund (UK)